Greg Weld (March 4, 1944 – August 4, 2008) was an American racecar driver and later a businessman who founded an automotive aftermarkets parts manufacturer that carries his name.

Weld won the 1963 Knoxville Nationals, the premiere event in sprint car racing. Weld raced in the USAC Championship Car series in the 1965–1972 seasons, with 36 career starts, including the 1970 Indianapolis 500. He finished in the top ten 11 times, with his best finish in 4th position in 1970 at Sacramento. He was also the 1967 USAC Sprint Car Series champion. He was the last driver to pilot a car powered by the famous Novi engine at the Indianapolis Motor Speedway when he crashed during a qualification attempt in 1966.

Weld also founded Weld Wheel Industries, a firm manufacturing forged alloy wheels for various vehicles, including race cars, and was an active sponsor of both race cars and series, including the United States Auto Club series, and ran the firm until its acquisition by American Racing Equipment in 2006, and acquired by Momo and later Grupo Cisneros in 2017.  Today, it is part of the MW Company, based in Kansas City, Missouri.

Awards
 He was inducted in the National Sprint Car Hall of Fame in 1998.

Indy 500 results

References

External links
Weld Racing

1944 births
2008 deaths
American racing drivers
Indianapolis 500 drivers
National Sprint Car Hall of Fame inductees
Racing drivers from Kansas City, Missouri
Racing drivers from Missouri
Sportspeople from Kansas City, Missouri
USAC Silver Crown Series drivers